Kingston upon Hull North is a borough constituency for the House of Commons of the Parliament of the United Kingdom. It elects one Member of Parliament (MP) at least once every five years by the first-past-the-post electoral system. The constituency has been represented by Diana Johnson of the Labour Party since the 2005 general election.

Boundaries

1950–1955: The County Borough of Hull wards of Beverley, Newland, Park, and University.

1955–1974: The County Borough of Hull wards of Beverley, Botanic, Newland, Paragon, Park, University, and West Central.

1983–2010:  The City of Hull wards of Avenue, Beverley, Newland, Noddle Hill, Orchard Park, Stoneferry, and University.

2010–present:  The City of Hull wards of Avenue, Beverley, Bransholme East, Bransholme West, Bricknell, Kings Park, Newland, Orchard Park and Greenwood, and University.

Constituency profile
This constituency covers the northern part of Hull. A diverse constituency: in west Hull it includes the large working class housing estates of North Hull Estate and Orchard Park Estate, as well as the Newland, The Avenues, Newland Park and Beverley High Road areas. The University of Hull is located in the Newland area of the constituency and the Beverley Road and Newland areas have large student populations. The constituency extends east of the River Hull including the Bransholme housing estate, and the developing (2010s) housing estate of Kingswood.

Members of Parliament

1950–1974

1983–present

Elections

Elections in the 2010s

Elections in the 2000s

Elections in the 1990s

Elections in the 1980s

Elections 1950–1970

See also
List of parliamentary constituencies in Humberside

References

Politics of Kingston upon Hull
Parliamentary constituencies in Yorkshire and the Humber
Constituencies of the Parliament of the United Kingdom established in 1950
Constituencies of the Parliament of the United Kingdom disestablished in 1974
Constituencies of the Parliament of the United Kingdom established in 1983